Tore André "Totto" Dahlum (born 21 June 1968) is a Norwegian former professional footballer who played as a forward. During his playing career, he had three spells at Start and two spells at Rosenborg. He also played briefly in Denmark, Greece and Belgium.

Club career
Born in Kristiansand, Dahlum's career started with FK Vigør. In 1992, he went on a two-week trial at Manchester United. Dahlum had his best years in the early 1990s. As a member of Start, he became the top goalscorer in the Norwegian top division in 1990, with 20 goals. He also made his international debut the same year.

In 1992, Dahlum was signed by Rosenborg, where he failed to live up to expectations, and was subsequently dropped by both the club and the national team, although he scored the first goal in the 3–2 Norwegian Cup final win against Lillestrøm. After two seasons at the Trondheim club, he returned to Start. Following Start's relegation in 1996, he had a short spell at Greek side Skoda Xanthi, before returning home the following year for a second spell at Rosenborg.

He later played briefly at Belgian club K.A.A. Gent and Danish club AaB, before finishing his professional career in 2001 where it began, for his hometown club Start. He later played a few games in the lower leagues with local Kristiansand club Flekkerøy IL.

After retiring he worked as a commentator for TV 2 before moving into management.

International career
Dahlum made his international debut for the Norway national team in 1990. Overall, he played 15 internationals and scored six goals for Norway. His finest moment at international level was probably the European Championship qualifier against Italy in 1991, where Dahlum scored Norway's first goal in a 2–1 win.

After playing 12 international games from 1990 to 1992, he did not feature again for Norway until 1999, when he made three additional appearances (all as substitute), scoring one goal.

Managerial career
In November 2007 he was announced as the new coach of fourth-tier club FK Jerv.

Personal life
Dahlum is married to Kirsti and has two children, Henrik and Karine. He currently lives in Kristiansand.

Career statistics

Honours
Rosenborg
Norwegian top division: 1992, 1993, 1997, 1998, 1999
Norwegian Cup: 1992, 1999

Individual
Tippeligaen top scorer: 1990
Kniksen award: Attacker of the year 1990

References

External links
 Jerv FK profile

1968 births
Living people
Norwegian footballers
Norway international footballers
Norwegian expatriate footballers
Eliteserien players
Norwegian First Division players
Super League Greece players
Belgian Pro League players
Danish Superliga players
IK Start players
Rosenborg BK players
K.A.A. Gent players
Xanthi F.C. players
Kniksen Award winners
Expatriate footballers in Greece
Expatriate footballers in Belgium
Expatriate men's footballers in Denmark
Norwegian expatriate sportspeople in Greece
Norwegian expatriate sportspeople in Belgium
Norwegian expatriate sportspeople in Denmark
Norwegian football managers
Association football forwards
Sportspeople from Kristiansand
FK Jerv managers